HMS Negro was an Admiralty M-class destroyer of the Royal Navy. The ship was the second Royal Navy warship to bear the name Negro with the first being the 1813 Negro, ex-Niger.

Description
The Admiralty M class were improved and faster versions of the preceding . They displaced . They were powered by three Parsons direct-drive steam turbines, each driving one propeller shaft, using steam provided by four Yarrow boilers. The ships' complement was 76 officers and ratings.

The ships were armed with three single QF  Mark IV guns and two QF 1.5-pounder (37 mm) anti-aircraft guns. These latter guns were later replaced by a pair of QF 2-pounder (40 mm) "pom-pom" anti-aircraft guns. The ships were also fitted with two above water twin mounts for  torpedoes.

Construction
The outbreak of the First World War meant that the Royal Navy had a requirement for large numbers of extra destroyers to replace expected war losses, and a number of large orders were quickly placed, with existing types such as the M class being favoured to allow rapid construction. Negro was one of ten M-class destroyers ordered as part of the Second War Programme in early November 1914. She was laid down at Palmers Shipbuilding and Iron Company's Jarrow shipyard in January 1915, was launched on 8 March 1916 and completed in May 1916.

Service
On commissioning, Negro joined the 13th Destroyer Flotilla of the Grand Fleet. Having only recently been completed, Negro did not sail with her Flotilla on 30 May 1916 to take part in the Battle of Jutland on 31 May – 1 June, although in the aftermath of the battle she did help to escort the damaged battleship  back to Rosyth. On 18 August 1916, the Grand Fleet sailed in response to a sortie by the German High Seas Fleet. The two fleets failed to meet each other before the Germans withdrew, but as the Grand Fleet was heading for home, the light cruiser  was torpedoed twice by the German submarine  at 16:52hr. Negro along with the destroyers  and  came to Falmouths aid and after U-66 was driven off by Pelican, escorted the damaged cruiser as she slowly made her way towards the Humber estuary. Falmouth eventually sank at 08:10hr on 21 August near Flamborough Head.

Sinking
On 19 December 1916, the Grand Fleet left Scapa Flow to carry out exercises between Shetland and Norway. On the morning of 20 December, the Flotilla leader  suffered a failure of her steering gear at high speed, almost colliding with several other ships, and was detached to return to Scapa with Negro as escort. At about 01:30 hr on 21 December, in extremely poor weather, with gale-force winds and a heavy sea, Hostes rudder jammed again, forcing the ship into a sudden turn to port. Negro, following about  behind, collided with Hoste. The collision knocked two depth charges off Hostes stern which exploded, badly damaging the rear end of Hoste and blowing in the bottom of Negros hull, flooding her engine room. Negro sank quickly, and despite the efforts of the destroyer  to rescue survivors, fifty-one officers and men of Negros crew were killed. Marmion and  attempted to tow the crippled Hoste back to Scapa, but after three hours, Hoste began to founder. Despite the severe conditions, Marvel went alongside Hoste to rescue the crew of the sinking ship, and when repeatedly forced apart by the heavy seas, repeated the manoeuvre another twelve times. While Marvel sustained damage to her forecastle from repeated impacts between the two ships, she managed to rescue all but four of Hostes crew before Hoste finally sank. Eight officers and 126 men were rescued by Marvel.

References

Citations

Bibliography 

 

 

 

Admiralty M-class destroyers
Ships built on the River Tyne
World War I destroyers of the United Kingdom
Protected Wrecks of the United Kingdom
Ships built by Palmers Shipbuilding and Iron Company
Maritime incidents in 1916
1916 ships
Ships sunk in collisions
World War I shipwrecks in the North Sea